Mirza Kambili is a Village and union council in Punjab, Pakistan.

On 1 July 2004, Mirza Kambili became the Union Council of Tehsil Kallar Syeda. Rawalpindi District was a Union Council of the Tehsil Kahuta.

External links
https://lgcd.punjab.gov.pk/system/files/demarcation%20notifications%20combined%20(1).pdf
</noinclude>

Union councils of Kallar Syedan Tehsil
Populated places in Kallar Syedan Tehsil
Villages in Kallar Syedan Tehsil